Vanam is a 2021 Indian Tamil-language thriller film directed by Srikantan Anand and produced by Golden Star Productions Pvt Ltd. The film stars Vetri, Anu Sithara and Smruthi Venkat in the lead roles, and the music is composed by Ron Ethan Yohann. The film released theatrically on 26 November 2021.

Synopsis 
An art college student, with the help of a documentary filmmaker, tries to find the reasons behind the mysterious deaths of the people who have stayed in a hostel room.

Cast 
 Vetri as Magizh
 Anu Sithara as Malli
 Smruthi Venkat as Jasmine
 Azhagam Perumal
 Vela Ramamoorthy
 Ravi Venkatraman

Soundtrack

The soundtrack and score was composed by Ron Ethan Yohann.

Reception 
The Times of India gave the film a rating of 2.5 out of 5 and wrote, "Vanam is a run-of-the-mill horror thriller." Bharat Kumar of News Today wrote, "Vanam is a movie that manages a decent watch. Good writing is the key." Sify called it a "run of the mill thriller" and "yet another horror-thriller in Tamil cinema with an earnest flashback episode", rating it 2 out of 5.

References

External links